Belgium was represented by Barbara Dex at the Eurovision Song Contest 1993, which took place in Millstreet, Ireland, performing "Iemand als jij". Dex was the winner of the Flemish national final for the contest, Eurosong '93.

Before Eurovision

Eurosong '93 
Flemish broadcaster Belgische Radio- en Televisieomroep Nederlandstalige Uitzendingen (BRTN) was in charge of preparations for the Belgian entry for the 1993 Contest. BRTN held a national final to select the entry for the Contest, consisting of four semi-finals leading up to a grand final on 6 March 1993. The shows were held in Knokke Casino, hosted by Alexandra Potvin and Hans Otten.

Semi-finals
Four semi-finals were held in February 1993 to select the 12 finalists for the Belgian final. 10 songs competed in each semi-final, with the top 3 songs, selected by an expert jury, progressing to the final.

Final
The final of the contest was held on 6 March 1993, where the winner of the Contest was selected from the 12 semi-final qualifiers by six juries: five regional juries and one expert jury. The final winner was Barbara Dex with "Iemand als jij".

Voting

At Eurovision 
On the night of the final Dex performed 7th in the running order, following Greece and preceding Malta. Her performance became infamous due to her see-through dress, which she made herself. At the close of the voting "Iemand als jij" had received 3 points, placing Belgium 25th and last, relegating the country from taking part in the 1994 Contest.

Voting

References

External links 
Belgian National Final 1993

1993
Countries in the Eurovision Song Contest 1993
Eurovision